is a monorail station on the Chiba Urban Monorail in Wakaba-ku in the city of Chiba, Chiba Prefecture, Japan. It is located 10.2 kilometers from the northern terminus of the line at Chiba Station.

Lines
Chiba Urban Monorail Line 2

Layout
Oguradai Station is an elevated station with two opposed side platforms serving two tracks.

Platforms

History
Oguradai Station opened on March 28, 1988.

External links

Chiba Urban Monorail home page 

Railway stations in Japan opened in 1988
Railway stations in Chiba Prefecture